Acacia filipes is a shrub belonging to the genus Acacia and the subgenus Juliflorae that is endemic to a small area in northern Australia.

Description
It has slender and angular branchlets that are ribbed and resinous. Like most species of Acacia it has phyllodes rather than true leaves. It blooms in February and fruits in May.

Distribution
It is native to a small area in Kakadu National Park in the Northern Territory mostly within Deaf Adder gorge where it is situated on top of sandstone escarpments as a part of open woodland communities.

See also
 List of Acacia species

References

filifolia
Flora of the Northern Territory
Taxa named by Leslie Pedley
Plants described in 1999